Albert Resis (December 16, 1921 – March 10, 2021) was an American academic and writer in the field of Russian history. He worked as a professor of history at Northern Illinois University from 1964 to 1992, and then as a Professor emeritus from 1992.

He was the author of the books Stalin, the Politburo and the Onset of the Cold War: 1945-1946 (1988) and Molotov Remembers: Inside Kremlin Politics (together with Russian author Felix Chuev) (1993). He was also the main author of a number of articles in Encyclopædia Britannica on Russian and Soviet history.

Resis died in DeKalb, Illinois, in March 2021, at the age of 99.

References

1921 births
2021 deaths
20th-century American historians
20th-century American male writers
Historians of Russia
Northern Illinois University faculty
American male non-fiction writers